Joseph Vincent Maniaci (January 23, 1914 – June 20, 1996) was an American football player and coach.  He played college football at Fordham University and then in the National Football League (NFL) with the Brooklyn Dodgers and the Chicago Bears. He was drafted in the sixth round of the 1936 NFL Draft. Maniaci served as the head football coach at Saint Louis University from 1948 to 1949, compiling a record of 6–13–1.  The school dropped its varsity football program after the 1949 season.

Maniaci grew up in Lodi, New Jersey and attended Hasbrouck Heights High School. He served as a lieutenant in the United States Navy during World War II and the Korean War. Maniaci died on June 20, 1996, at his home in Windsor, Ontario.

Head coaching record

References

External links
 

1914 births
1996 deaths
American football fullbacks
American football quarterbacks
Bainbridge Commodores football coaches
Brooklyn Dodgers (NFL) players
Chicago Bears players
Fordham Rams football players
Hasbrouck Heights High School alumni
Saint Louis Billikens football coaches
United States Navy officers
United States Navy personnel of the Korean War
United States Navy personnel of World War II
People from Lodi, New Jersey
Players of American football from New York City
Sportspeople from Bergen County, New Jersey
Coaches of American football from New Jersey
Players of American football from New Jersey
Military personnel from New Jersey